Elvis Banyihwabe (born 15 April 1983) is a former Burundian international footballer who played twice for the Burundi national team, as a midfielder.

Club career
Born in the Burundian capital of Bujumbura, Banyihwabe fled to the Netherlands in 2001 as a result of the Burundian Civil War. During his time in the Netherlands, Banyihwabe played for BV Veendam, VV Berkum, DOS Kampen and Be Quick '28.

Following his time in Dutch football, Banyihwabe moved to England, playing for Bootle, Prescot Cables, Ashton Athletic, Congleton Town and AFC Liverpool.

International career
On 25 March 2007, Banyihwabe made his debut for Burundi in a 1–0 2008 Africa Cup of Nations qualification loss against Botswana.

References

1983 births
Living people
Sportspeople from Bujumbura
Burundian footballers
Association football midfielders
Burundi international footballers
Burundian emigrants to England
Burundian expatriate footballers
Burundian expatriate sportspeople in the Netherlands
SC Veendam players
Be Quick '28 players
Bootle F.C. players
Prescot Cables F.C. players
Ashton Athletic F.C. players
Congleton Town F.C. players
A.F.C. Liverpool players
North West Counties Football League players